The term directed evolution is used within the transhumanist community to refer to the idea of applying the principles of directed evolution and experimental evolution to the control of human evolution. In this sense, it is distinct from the use of the term in biochemistry, which refers only to the evolution of proteins and RNA. Maxwell J. Melhmanh has described directed evolution of humans as the Holy Grail of transhumanism.
Oxford philosopher Julian Savulescu wrote that:

According to UCLA biophysicist Gregory Stock:

Riccardo Campa, from the Institute for Ethics and Emerging Technologies, wrote that "self-directed evolution" can be coupled with many different political, philosophical, and religious views.

Criticism of the term
Andrew Askland, from the Sandra Day O'Connor College of Law claims that referring to transhumanism as directed evolution is problematic because evolution is ateleological and transhumanism is teleological.

Participant evolution
Participant evolution is an alternative term that refers to the process of deliberately redesigning the human body and brain using technological means, rather than through the natural processes of mutation and natural selection, with the goal of removing "biological limitations" and human enhancement. The idea of participant evolution was first put forward by Manfred Clynes and Nathan S. Kline in the 1960s in their article Cyborgs and Space, where they argued that the human species was already on a path of participant evolution. Science fiction writers have speculated what the next stage of such participant evolution will be.

Whilst Clynes and Kline saw participant evolution as the process of creating cyborgs, the idea has been adopted and propounded by transhumanists who argue that individuals should have the choice of using human enhancement technologies on themselves and their children, to progressively become transhuman and ultimately posthuman, as part of a voluntary regimen of participant evolution.

See also

References

Transhumanism
Evolution